Jan Verelst can refer to:
 John Verelst,  also Jan or Johannes (1648-1734), Dutch Golden Age painter
 Jan Verelst (born ca 1960), Belgian computer scientist